Rocky Comfort Creek is a stream near Florida's capital city of Tallahassee. It now feeds into Lake Talquin which was formed by a dam on the Ochlockonee River.

David Ochiltree who served as mayor of Tallahassee in 1827 resided in a home by the creek and died there in 1834. He moved to Florida from Fayetteville, North Carolina. He was also a colonel and was a member elect of the Legislative Council for Gadsden County when he died.

A historical marker commemorates Bryan Croom's Rocky Comfort plantation. He was the brother of Hardy Bryan Croom.

Lake Talquin State Forest has a Rocky Comfort tract.

References

Bodies of water of Gadsden County, Florida
Rivers of Florida